Karin Jarl-Sakellarios (6 October 1885 – 20 November 1948) was an Austrian sculptor. Her work was part of the sculpture event in the art competition at the 1948 Summer Olympics.

References

1885 births
1948 deaths
20th-century Austrian sculptors
20th-century Austrian women artists
Austrian sculptors
Olympic competitors in art competitions
Artists from Vienna